The 1939 Tour de France was the 33rd edition of Tour de France, one of cycling's Grand Tours. The Tour began in Paris with a flat stage on 10 July, and Stage 10c occurred on 21 July with a flat stage to Montpellier. The race finished in Paris on 30 July.

Stage 1
10 July 1939 — Paris to Caen,

Stage 2a
11 July 1939 — Caen to Vire,  (ITT)

Stage 2b
21 July 1939 — Vire to Rennes,

Stage 3
12 July 1939 — Rennes to Brest,

Stage 4
13 July 1939 — Brest to Lorient,

Stage 5
14 July 1939 — Lorient to Nantes,

Stage 6a
15 July 1939 — Nantes to La Rochelle,

Stage 6b
15 July 1939 — La Rochelle to Royan,

Stage 7
17 July 1939 — Royan to Bordeaux,

Stage 8a
18 July 1939 — Bordeaux to Salies-de-Béarn,

Stage 8b
18 July 1939 — Salies-de-Béarn to Pau,  (ITT)

Stage 9
19 July 1939 — Pau to Toulouse,

Stage 10a
21 July 1939 — Toulouse to Narbonne,

Stage 10b
21 July 1939 — Narbonne to Béziers,  (ITT)

Stage 10c
21 July 1939 — Béziers to Montpellier,

References

1939 Tour de France
Tour de France stages